Fourmile or Four Mile  may refer to:

People
 Henrietta Marrie, an Australian human rights activist, née Henrietta Fourmile

Canyons and bodies of water
 Fourmile Canyon and Fourmile Creek, west of Boulder, Colorado, the site of a major wildfire in 2010
 Fourmile Canyon Creek (north of Boulder, Colorado)
 Fourmile Canyon (Fremont County, Colorado) and the associated Fourmile Creek
 Fourmile Creek (Chaffee County, Colorado)
 Four Mile Creek (Walton County, Florida)

 Fourmile Creek (Iowa)
 Fourmile Creek (Neosho River tributary), a stream in Kansas
 Fourmile Creek (Whitewater River tributary), a stream in Kansas
 Four Mile Creek (Ohio)
 Fourmile Creek (Pennsylvania) in northwestern Pennsylvania
 Fourmile Creek (Belle Fourche River), a stream in South Dakota
 Fourmile Creek (Moreau River), a stream in South Dakota
 Fourmile Creek (Wood County, Wisconsin)
 Fourmile Lake (disambiguation)
 Four Mile Run in Virginia

Parks and trails
 Four Mile Creek State Park in New York State
 Four Mile Historic Park, on Cherry Creek, three miles east of downtown Denver, Colorado 
 Four Mile Run Trail in Virginia
 Fourmile Creek Natural Area, a protected area in Park County, Colorado, USA

Communities
 Fourmile, Alabama
 Four Mile Road, Alaska
 Four Mile Township, Wayne County, Illinois
 Fourmile, Kentucky
 Four Mile, New Jersey
Four Mile Circle, a traffic circle in the above community 
 Four Mile, Ohio
 Four Mile, South Dakota
 Four Mile, West Virginia
 Four Mile, Papua New Guinea
 Four Mile, Western Australia
 Four Mile Creek, Tasmania
 Four Mile Creek, New South Wales

Other
 Four Mile uranium mine in Australia